Aldingbourne is a mixed rural and residential civil and ecclesiastical parish in the Arun district of West Sussex, England.

The civil parish, named after the small village of Aldingbourne, includes the much larger settlement of Westergate, as well as smaller settlements Norton, Nyton, Woodgate and Lidsey.

Geography
The developed south and east of the parish is on fertile soil 7–15 metres above sea level, whereas north of the A27 road at the foot of the South Downs National Park the land reaches 37 metres in altitude. Eartham is the neighbouring parish to the north.

History
First documented in 683 AD as Aldingburne, then 200 years later as Ealdingburnan, the name describes a stream or bourne (now known as Aldingbourne Rife) belonging to Ealda, a Saxon settler. The place is described in the Domesday Book (1086) as having 69 households (28 villagers, 38 smallholders and three slaves), and a value to the lord of the manor of £18.

The Anglican parish church is dedicated to St Mary, and in 1861 had a population of 772. According to Sussex Notes and Queries, the history of the church building "is not clear". Different parts of the church date from both the twelfth and thirteenth century, with the chancel having been built in the thirteenth century. Later additions include a porch dating from the seventeenth century and an organ chamber that was "wholly modern" in 1944.

Economy
Agriculture occupies most of the land use and is a major employer. Other key industries include food and hospitality, general retail, the public sector, care, science and automotive-related careers.

Education
Ormiston Six Villages Academy (OSVA) is the main secondary school for the parish and surrounding area. It was formerly called Westergate Community School.

Sports
The parish is home to Fontwell Park Racecourse, a venue in horse racing and Denmans Gardens which specialises in exotic and unusual plants. Fontwell Park has a compact figure-of-eight chase course and an oval hurdles course.

Notable people
Dick Seaman, racing driver was born in the village on 4th February 1913

References

External links
 
 
Aldingbourne Parish Council web site 

Civil parishes in West Sussex
Villages in West Sussex
Arun District